The 1948 National Football League Draft was held on December 19, 1947, at the Fort Pitt Hotel in Pittsburgh. This was the second year that the first overall pick was a bonus pick determined by lottery, with the previous year's winner Chicago Bears ineligible from the draw; it was won by the Washington Redskins, who selected halfback Harry Gilmer.

Player selections

Hall of Famers
 Bobby Layne, quarterback from Texas taken 1st round 3rd overall by the Chicago Bears.
Inducted: Professional Football Hall of Fame class of 1967.
 Y. A. Tittle, quarterback from LSU taken 1st round 6th overall by the Detroit Lions.
Inducted: Professional Football Hall of Fame class of 1971.
 Lou Creekmur, tackle from William & Mary taken 243rd overall by the Philadelphia Eagles, and again in the 2nd round of the 1950 special draft by the Detroit Lions.
Inducted: Professional Football Hall of Fame class of 1996.
Joe Perry, fullback from Compton Junior College, signed undrafted by the San Francisco 49ers.
Inducted: Professional Football Hall of Fame class of 1969.
Emlen Tunnell, cornerback from Iowa, signed undrafted by the New York Giants.
Inducted: Professional Football Hall of Fame class of 1967.
Len Ford, defensive end from Michigan, signed undrafted by the Cleveland Browns.
Inducted: Professional Football Hall of Fame class of 1976

Notable undrafted players

| San Francisco 49ers
| style="background:#fc0;"| Joe Perry‡
| FB
| Compton  
| align=center | N/A
| 
|-
| Cleveland Browns
| style="background:#fc0;"| Len Ford‡
| DE
| Michigan  
| align=center | Big Ten
| 
|-
| New York Giants
| style="background:#fc0;"| Emlen Tunnell‡
| CB
| Iowa  
| align=center | Big Ten
|

Notes

References

External links
 NFL.com – 1948 Draft
 databaseFootball.com – 1948 Draft
 Pro Football Hall of Fame

National Football League Draft
Draft
NFL Draft
NFL Draft
1940s in Pittsburgh
American football in Pittsburgh
Events in Pittsburgh